The blue bird-of-paradise (Paradisornis rudolphi) is a beautiful, relatively large species of bird-of-paradise. It is the only species in the genus Paradisornis, but was previously included in the genus Paradisaea.

It is often regarded as one of the most fabulous and extravagant of all birds of the world, with its glorified and fancy flank feathers present only in males and also their two long wires also only found in the males.

Taxonomy 
The blue bird-of-paradise was formally described in 1886 by the German naturalists Otto Finsch and Adolf Bernhard Meyer. They placed the bird in a new genus Paradisornis and coined the binomial name Paradisornis rudolphi. The genus name Paradisornis  combines the Ancient Greek paradeisos meaning "paradise" with ornis meaning "bird". The specific epithet rudolphi was chosen to honour Archduke Rudolf Franz Karl Joseph, the Crown-Prince of Austria. This species was formerly placed in the genus Paradisaea.

Two subspecies are recognised:
 P. r. margaritae (Mayr & Gilliard, 1951) – east central New Guinea
 P. r. rudolphi Finsch & Meyer, AB, 1886 – southeast New Guinea

The blue bird-of-paradise is known to have hybridized with Lawes's parotia (Parotia lawesii), which is called "Schodde's bird-of-paradise", and also with the Raggiana bird-of-paradise (Paradisaea raggiana).Description

Arguably one of the most fabulous of its family, the blue bird-of-paradise is among the larger birds-of-paradise, being around 30 cm, or a little over a foot in length (excluding the long tail wires), rivaling some of the Paradisaea and Manucodia species. Unlike the Paradisaea birds, the male is mostly glossy black overall with silver-white crescents surrounding the eyes (in both sexes). They have a very crow-like bill that is whiteish to light greyish in colour. The back of the head has a reddish gloss that stretches down to the mantle, or back. A defining feature found in both sexes are the shiny, blue wings that are more commonly light blue but can range from light blue, aqua or even a skyish-baby blue; the tail is also like this. Stretching from the tail are two blackish and elongated wires with small, whitish spatulate tips similar Paradisaea'' males' wires. The most brilliant and distinctive feature present on the male are the fine, silky elongated flank plumes that are mainly a dull amber colour on the surface; below, they are a light blue, based by two dark crimson lines on each side of the lower belly. These elegant features help the male create an illusion for his potential audience. The female, however, is more or less similar to the male; of course, she lacks the opulent flank plumes and tail wires present on the male, but she does sport bright blue wings and tail feathers like the male. Instead of having an all-black underside, she is chestnut-brown below with blackish barring. Her head and neck are more duller also, with only a faint reddish gloss present. They have purplish-grey legs and feet and greyer claws. The wires on the blue bird-of-paradise are 25 inches long.

Behaviour and ecology

Diet 
The blue bird-of-paradise is mainly a frugivorous species, feeding on a good variety of fruits like figs, drupes, berries, but animal prey is also present in the diet; it includes insects, but also likely takes some vertebrates like reptiles. They typically feed alone, though females and juveniles are more likely to feed in trees in association with other birds or other species. They are shown to search high in the canopy when seeking fruits, and apparently forage at lower altitudes when in search of their animal prey.

Breeding 

The male is polygamous and performs a breathtaking courtship display. But unlike most other birds of paradise species, he performs solitary on a preferably thin branch, while an attending female observes nearby. In the display, the male hangs from a branch upside down. The black oval with red margin at the center of his chest is rhythmically enlarged and contracted. His violet blue plumes spread out in a fan, looking like an apron, swaying its body back and forth while the black wires form two impressive arches down to either side. During this display, he continuously makes a soft, insect-like buzzing noise, mixed with a chittering or chattering noise to rope the female back in if she moves away.

The nesting and parental duties are covered only by the females; she builds her nest with stems, twigs, palm leaves, vines and other materials all by herself, usually in a flat cup-like shape. They mostly lay one egg, but two are less occasional, and the mother is very defensive of her brood. The eggs are described to be a salmon-type color, with the ends being ringed with flecks of cinnamon-rufous to tawny.

Status and conservation 
Due to ongoing habitat loss, limited range, small population size and, in some areas, by hunting for its highly prized plumes, the rare blue bird-of-paradise is classified as Near Threatened on the IUCN Red List of Threatened Species. It is listed on Appendix II of CITES. Its population is thought to have a decreasing trend, estimated to be anywhere from 2,500 to 10 000 individuals.

Gallery

References

External links

 ARKive - images and movies of the Blue Bird-of-paradise (Paradisaea rudolphi)
 BirdLife International: Blue Bird-of-paradise  Paradisaea rudolphi 

blue bird-of-paradise
Birds of Papua New Guinea
Birds described in 1885
blue bird-of-paradise
Endemic fauna of Papua New Guinea